Bordon is a surname. Notable people with the surname include: 

Antonio Bordon, Paraguayan handball coach
Furio Bordon, Italian writer
Ivano Bordon (born 1951), Italian footballer
José Octavio Bordón (born 1945), Argentine politician and diplomat
Luis Bordón, Paraguayan musician and composer
Marcelo Bordon (born 1976), Brazilian footballer
Nadia Bordon (born 1988), Argentine handball player
Orlando Bordón (born 1986), Paraguayan footballer
Patrik Bordon (born 1988), Slovenian footballer
Rebeca Bordon (born 1994), Paraguayan handball player
Stefano Bordon (born 1968), Italian rugby player and coach
Willer Bordon (1949-2015), Italian, academic, businessman and politician